Cieszynka is a river of Poland, a tributary of the Płociczna. It passes through Człopa, West Pomeranian Voivodeship. In German it was known as the Dessel.

References

Rivers of West Pomeranian Voivodeship
Wałcz County